Trealease is a surname. People with this name include:

Allen W. Trelease (c. 1928/1929–2011), American historian, author, and professor
George E. Trelease, namesake of the George E. Trelease Memorial Baseball Park in Springfield, Massachusetts
Jim Trelease (born 1941), American educator and author
Richard M. Trelease, Jr. (1921–2005), bishop of the Episcopal Diocese of the Rio Grande
William Trelease (1857–1945), American botanist, entomologist, and explorer